José Filipe da Silva Moreira  (born 20 March 1982) is a Portuguese former professional footballer who played as a goalkeeper.

He spent most of his career with Benfica, appearing in 148 competitive matches and making his debut at only 19. He also competed in Wales and Cyprus.

Moreira earned 79 caps for Portugal all youth levels comprised, and was called up to the senior team at Euro 2004.

Club career

Early years
Born in Massarelos, Porto, Moreira preferred to play as an attacking midfielder in his early years but, following the advice of father José, soon changed his playing position and took trials for S.C. Salgueiros.

In 1997, at only 15 years of age, Moreira caught the eye of the biggest Portuguese teams — Sporting CP, FC Porto, Boavista F.C. and S.L. Benfica. The latter made the best bid to Salgueiros and won the race to sign the youngster but, due to his young age, decided it was best to keep him at the club for two more years; when he arrived to the Estádio da Luz he was called for a mini-tour with the main squad in the Azores, going on to make his unofficial senior debut.

Benfica
In 1999, Moreira was selected by the Portuguese under–18 coach Agostinho Oliveira for the UEFA European Championship in Sweden, with the national team winning the title. Subsequently, he returned to Benfica, being called by team manager Jupp Heynckes to join the pre-season tour in Austria. At the time, two of the three senior goalkeepers were not available (Carlos Bossio was in Argentina and Nuno Santos was injured, leaving Robert Enke as the only available keeper); without competition for the substitutes bench he was called to sit in for several matches during August and December 1999, but would only play two years later in a home game against Vitória de Guimarães, replacing the injured Enke after 24 minutes and delivering a clean sheet on his professional debut (0–0 draw).

Moreira had also time to conquer the junior national championship in 2000, adding the Toulon Tournament with the under-20s after beating Colombia in the final. He started on 9 March 2002 in a 2–0 success at Gil Vicente F.C. and, when German Enke left at the end of the season to sign with Spain's FC Barcelona, he became the number one choice from then on.

Moreira made his debut in European competitions during 2003–04, playing in the UEFA Cup against Molde FK (at home, in a 3–1 win). The season ended with Benfica, led by José Antonio Camacho, winning the Taça de Portugal after beating Porto managed by José Mourinho; he renewed his link in April 2004 until 2010, shortly after joining the Portugal B squad for the Vale do Tejo International Tournament to win the tournament and be chosen best goalkeeper in the competition.

With the arrival of Quim from S.C. Braga in August 2004, Moreira began suffering stiff competition for the starting job. He contributed with 15 games as the side won the Primeira Liga title after 11 years but, on 18 October 2005, underwent surgery to his right knee, which caused him to miss most of 2005–06.

Upon his return to competition, Moreira found himself having to compete for backup goalkeeper duties with recently signed Brazilian Marcelo Moretto, the same happening in the 2006–07 season. Moretto was then loaned to Greece's AEK Athens F.C. in August 2007.

The 2007–08 campaign brought a new challenge to Moreira, as the club signed 33-year-old Hans-Jörg Butt, known for taking free kicks and penalties. He suffered another injury during pre-season, this time on his left knee, which forced him to again undergo surgery and be sidelined for four months.

In a turbulent 2008–09, where all three goalkeepers went from first to third-choice in a matter of weeks, Moreira appeared in 14 league matches, as Benfica finished third. Following the arrival of another Brazilian, Júlio César, signed from C.F. Os Belenenses in the next off-season alongside manager Jorge Jesus, he was demoted to third-choice. In June 2010, as his contract was not renewed, it looked like he would leave the club after an 11-year link, with speculation arising that he would join Lisbon neighbours Sporting; after Quim was released from the club, however, later rejoining Braga, he eventually put pen to paper a new three-year contract.

Moreira was again third-choice in 2010–11, behind César and newly signed Roberto. He did appear in several games in the Taça da Liga, including the final against F.C. Paços de Ferreira where he stopped a penalty from Manuel José in an eventual 2–1 win, Benfica's third consecutive in the tournament.

Later career
On 8 July 2011, after 12 years with Benfica, Moreira joined newly promoted Premier League club Swansea City for an undisclosed fee. He only made one competitive appearance during the season, a 1–3 away loss against Shrewsbury Town in the second round of the Football League Cup, and his contract was terminated by mutual consent on 17 May 2012.

In late January 2013, Moreira moved to AC Omonia in Cyprus. He returned to Portugal in summer 2015 at the age of 33, joining S.C. Olhanense. He made his debut on 12 September, in a 0–0 Segunda Liga home draw against C.D. Aves.

Moreira returned to the Portuguese top flight for the 2016–17 campaign, signing a two-year contract with G.D. Estoril Praia. On 25 June 2018, after suffering relegation, he returned to the second division after agreeing to a one-year contract at C.D. Cova da Piedade.

On 28 July 2019, Moreira announced his retirement aged 37.

International career
Internationally, Moreira represented Portugal at under-17, under-18, under-19, under-20 and under-21 levels. He was picked by senior team manager Luiz Felipe Scolari alongside Ricardo and Quim for UEFA Euro 2004 which was contested on home soil, but did not take any part in the tournament.

In a one-and-half-month period in the summer of 2004, Moreira represented Portugal at the European Under-21 Championship in Germany and acted as backup at Euro 2004, before a trip to Athens for the Summer Olympics, where he started.

On 12 August 2009, five years after his Euro 2004 selection, Moreira finally made his full squad debut, playing 30 minutes in a friendly win in Liechtenstein (3–0).

Club statistics

Honours

Club
Benfica
Primeira Liga: 2004–05
Taça de Portugal: 2003–04
Supertaça Cândido de Oliveira: 2005
Taça da Liga: 2009–10, 2010–11

International
Portugal U-18
UEFA European Under-18 Championship: 1999

Portugal U-21
Toulon Tournament: 2001

Portugal
UEFA European Championship runner-up: 2004

Orders
 Medal of Merit, Order of the Immaculate Conception of Vila Viçosa (House of Braganza)

References

External links

 
 National team data 
 

1982 births
Living people
Footballers from Porto
Portuguese footballers
Association football goalkeepers
Primeira Liga players
Liga Portugal 2 players
Segunda Divisão players
S.L. Benfica B players
S.L. Benfica footballers
S.C. Olhanense players
G.D. Estoril Praia players
C.D. Cova da Piedade players
Swansea City A.F.C. players
Cypriot First Division players
AC Omonia players
Portugal youth international footballers
Portugal under-21 international footballers
Portugal B international footballers
Portugal international footballers
UEFA Euro 2004 players
Olympic footballers of Portugal
Footballers at the 2004 Summer Olympics
Portuguese expatriate footballers
Expatriate footballers in Wales
Expatriate footballers in Cyprus
Portuguese expatriate sportspeople in Wales
Portuguese expatriate sportspeople in Cyprus